Marianne Tucker (born 23 October 1937) is a British sprint canoer who competed in the early to mid-1960s. Competing two Summer Olympics, she was eliminated in the semifinals of the K-1 500 m events at both games (1960: fourth place, 1964: fifth place).

References
Sports-reference.com profile

1937 births
Canoeists at the 1960 Summer Olympics
Canoeists at the 1964 Summer Olympics
Living people
Olympic canoeists of Great Britain
British female canoeists